Klara Andersson (born 29 February 2000) is a Swedish rallycross driver who currently competes in the FIA World Rallycross Championship for the CE Dealer Team and is the Extreme E reserve driver.

Biography
A member of the Sweden Junior National Team of Motorsport, Andersson started her career in karting before switching to rallycross in 2018 after a five-year hiatus. She made her way up the national motorsport scene, including a wildcard appearance at the 2019 RallyX Nordic season finale, and finished runner-up in the JSM (Junior) class of the 2020 Swedish Rallycross Championship, driving a BMW 120. The following year she made the step up to the SM (Senior) 2150 class, unexpectedly winning the title in her first season in a field that consisted of more than 50 drivers.

After impressing in the FIA RX2e Championship, where she achieved a best finish of 4th at Spa-Francorchamps from two rounds, and in the Extreme E rookie test, Andersson was signed by Xite Energy Racing to partner team owner Oliver Bennett for the 2022 Extreme E season. However, she contracted COVID-19 shortly before the opening round in Saudi Arabia and was replaced by the championship's female reserve driver Tamara Molinaro. Molinaro was eventually retained by the team, with Andersson taking her place as reserve. The Swede would make her long-awaited Extreme E debut in September at the fourth event of the season, the Copper X-Prix in Chile, standing in for Jutta Kleinschmidt, who injured herself during free practice, at Abt Cupra XE. Together with Dakar Rally legend Nasser Al-Attiyah, Andersson took third place, thus achieving a podium finish on debut.

In May 2022 it was announced that Andersson would join Niclas Grönholm at the Construction Equipment Dealer Team in RX1e, the top class of the 2022 FIA World Rallycross Championship, in what became the first full-season gender equal line-up of the championship. She made history in round 5 of the season in Portugal by becoming the first ever woman to step on a top-flight rallycross podium.

She is the younger sister of former FIA European Rallycross Championship event-winner Magda Andersson.

Racing record

Complete FIA World Rallycross Championship results
(key)

RX2e

RX1e

Complete Extreme E results
(key)

* Season still in progress.

References

External links 
 

2000 births
Living people
Swedish female racing drivers
Swedish racing drivers
World Rallycross Championship drivers
Extreme E drivers
Abt Sportsline drivers
Cupra Racing drivers